Ambrose Maréchal, P.S.S. (August 28, 1764 – January 29, 1828) was an American Sulpician and prelate of the Roman Catholic Church who served as the third Archbishop of the Archdiocese of Baltimore in Maryland. He dedicated the Basilica of the National Shrine of the Assumption of the Blessed Virgin Mary, the oldest cathedral in the United States, in Baltimore in 1821.

Biography
Maréchal was born at Ingré in the former Province of Orléanais in the Kingdom of France on August 28, 1764, of fairly prosperous parents. He studied for the legal profession, but later entered the Sulpician seminary at Orléans, where he received the tonsure towards the close of 1787.

France was in such a chaotic condition that he left Paris for Bordeaux, where he was ordained in 1792. On the day of his ordination, and at the risk of his life, accompanied by the Abbés Richard, Martignon and Cicquard, he sailed for America and arrived at Baltimore on June 24, 1792, where he offered his first Mass.

Maréchal was sent to the mission in St. Mary's County, and later to Bohemia on the eastern shore of Maryland. In 1799 he was teaching theology at the Sulpician's St. Mary's Seminary, in Baltimore, and in 1801 he was teaching philosophy at Georgetown College.

Civil government having been restored in France under Napoleon, in 1803 Maréchal was recalled to France by his superiors to teach at Saint-Flour, Lyon, Aix and Marseilles. In 1812 he was again assigned to teach at St. Mary's in Baltimore, where for a time he also served as president. His pupils at Marseilles presented him with the marble altar which now stands in the Baltimore Basilica, and King Louis XVIII demonstrated his regard by presenting him with several paintings, which also remain in that Basilica.

Archbishop
In 1816 he was nominated Bishop of Philadelphia, but at his request the nomination was withdrawn and, on July 24, 1817, he was appointed Coadjutor bishop to Archbishop Leonard Neale of Baltimore, and Titular of Stauropolis. The brief of the appointment had not reached Baltimore when Archbishop Neale died, and Maréchal was not consecrated Archbishop of Baltimore by Bishop Cheverus of Boston until December 14, 1817.

Maréchal indicated that the most pressing problems facing the Archdiocese were the shortage of priests and rebellious trustees who wished to determine where those few be assigned. This appeared to be a particular problem in parishes with a dominant number of Irish immigrants, who would support a particular cleric regardless of how unsuitable or unqualified. In 1820 Bishop Flaget of Bardstown warned Maréchal of an individual who seemed to have the appropriate letters of introduction, but upon observing him say Mass, appeared not to be a priest at all. Maréchal advised the Propaganda Fide (Congregation for the Evangelization of Peoples) of the matter of problematic Irish priests being given letters of transfer by their bishops. During his tenure, the dioceses of Richmond and Charleston were created.

The building of the Baltimore Basilica, the first Catholic Cathedral built in the United States, which had been begun under Archbishop John Carroll in 1806, was now resumed and completed and was dedicated on May 31, 1821, under the title of the Assumption of the Blessed Virgin Mary.

Also in 1821, Maréchal went to Rome on business of his diocese, and in connection with the White Marsh plantation which the Archbishop claimed as Diocesan property, but which had been given to the Jesuits on February 17, 1728, and was claimed by them as property of the Society to be employed in the interests of the Church of Maryland. The archbishop secured from Rome a Bull in his favour.

In 1826 Maréchal made a journey to Canada, and on his return fell ill. He died at age 63 on January 29, 1828, in Baltimore. His coadjutor, James Whitfield, who succeeded him as Archbishop of Baltimore, had not yet been consecrated when Maréchal died. Maréchal's body is interred in the Baltimore Basilica's crypt, and his heart is in the chapel behind Elizabeth Ann Seton's house in downtown Baltimore.

Works
His writings consist almost entirely of letters and documents scholarly in style, and are to be found in "The History of the Society of Jesus in North America" by Hughes.

See also

 Catholic Church in the United States
 Historical list of the Catholic bishops of the United States
 List of Catholic bishops of the United States
 Lists of patriarchs, archbishops, and bishops

Notes

References

External links
Roman Catholic Archdiocese of Baltimore

1764 births
1828 deaths
People from Loiret
Sulpicians
18th-century French Roman Catholic priests
French emigrants to the United States
Georgetown University faculty
St. Mary's Seminary and University faculty
Roman Catholic archbishops of Baltimore
19th-century Roman Catholic archbishops in the United States
Sulpician bishops
Burials at the Basilica of the National Shrine of the Assumption of the Blessed Virgin Mary
18th-century American clergy